Pheasant Creek is a creek that runs along the bottom of one of the many coulees that branch off the Qu'Appelle Valley and empties into the Qu'Appelle River in southern Saskatchewan. The creek starts between the communities of Ituna and Jasmin, meanders south of the village of Abernethy and north of the village of Sintaluta. The Qu'Appelle River drainage basin is divided into two sections, the Upper and lower watersheds. Pheasant Creek is a tributary of the lower watershed.

See also 
List of rivers of Saskatchewan

References 

Rivers of Saskatchewan
Tributaries of Hudson Bay
Tributaries of the Assiniboine River